Alfred Ferraz (17 June 1907 – 11 December 1989) was a French architect. His work was part of the architecture event in the art competition at the 1948 Summer Olympics.

References

1907 births
1989 deaths
20th-century French architects
Olympic competitors in art competitions
People from Saint-Chamond